Alex Martins Ferreira (born 8 July 1993) is a Brazilian professional footballer who plays as a forward for Liga 1 club Bhayangkara.

Club statistics
Updated to 31 October 2021.

References

External links

Profile at Fukushima United FC
Profile at Kagoshima United FC

1993 births
Living people
Brazilian footballers
J2 League players
J3 League players
China League One players
Shonan Bellmare players
Fukushima United FC players
Kagoshima United FC players
Tochigi SC players
Brazilian expatriate footballers
Shanghai Shenxin F.C. players
Shanghai Jiading Huilong F.C. players
Brazilian expatriate sportspeople in Japan
Expatriate footballers in Japan
Expatriate footballers in China
Brazilian expatriate sportspeople in China
Brazilian expatriate sportspeople in South Korea
Expatriate footballers in South Korea
Association football forwards